John Francis Harvey  (April 14, 1918 – December 27, 2010) was a priest of the Oblates of St. Francis de Sales,  a moral theologian of the Catholic Church, and the founder of the DeSales School of Theology in Washington, DC. His opinions and ideas were expressed in written works in his effort to help the long-time problem of homosexuality in the Church conflicting with moral, Catholic teaching.

Harvey also founded the Courage Apostolate, an official Catholic organization that counsels gay or same-sex attracted Catholics to help them remain abstinent from gay/same-sex sexual- activities.

Early life and ordination
Harvey was born on April 14, 1918, in Philadelphia, Pennsylvania, the third of four children of Patrick J. and Margaret (née Harkins) Harvey. Patrick Harvey, a devout Catholic, was a native of Ireland. Margaret died when John Francis was an infant.

Harvey attended St. Columba Parish School, and after graduating from Northeast Catholic High School for Boys in 1936, he entered the Oblate Novitiate in Childs, MD, making his first profession of vows on September 8, 1937, and his perpetual vows on September 8, 1940. After earning his Bachelor of Arts degree in philosophy in 1941 from The Catholic University of America in Washington, DC, he continued his studies at that institution, earning a masters in psychology and philosophy, a licentiate in theology, and, ten years later, a doctorate in moral theology. He was ordained to the priesthood on June 3, 1944, at the Cathedral Basilica of SS. Peter and Paul in Philadelphia by Hugh L. Lamb, Auxiliary Bishop of Philadelphia.

Harvey was a lifelong fan of the Philadelphia Eagles and Phillies.

Priestly ministries

Educational and ministerial career 
After ordination, Harvey served as a high school teacher at Northeast Catholic High School from 1945 to 1947. He became a professor of moral theology at Dunbarton College of the Holy Cross and worked there from 1948 to 1973. He also acted as a professor of moral theology at DeSales Hall School of Theology, Washington, DC from the somewhat overlapping period of 1949 to 1987. He served as that school's president from 1965 to 1977. In addition, he served as professor of moral theology and president of Cluster of Independent Theological Schools in Washington, DC from 1980 to 1983. He also served as a visiting professor at several institutions, including Catholic Theological Union, Sydney, Australia, St. Joseph Seminary of the Archdiocese of New York, and Seton Hall University.

From 1990 to 2010 he was a professor of medical and sexual ethics at the Allentown College of St. Francis de Sales (since 2001, DeSales University) where he lived at Wills Hall, a student residence. He took on teaching duties at the Oblate House of Studies at The Catholic University of America, in Washington, D.C. until it was closed in 1997 because of a dearth of priestly candidates.

Courage Apostolate

Harvey is best known for urging the Catholics he called "same-sex attracted" to be chaste. The term "same-sex attracted" is often preferred by Catholics like him because they feel "gay" or "lesbian" is defining a person by their orientation inadvisably. In November 1978, Fr. Benedict Groeschel, C.F.R, recommended him to Terence Cardinal Cooke, Archbishop of New York, to start a new ministry for this purpose. Harvey started Courage Apostolate, a support group with five members. It had its first meeting on September 26, 1980, at the Church of St. Joseph in New York.

Harvey retired as executive director of Courage in 2008.

Publications and reception
In his writings, Harvey defended the traditional Catholic position on sexuality, while strongly contending that same sex attracted or LGBT Catholics deserve compassionate pastoral care.  In 1987, he published his best-known book, The Homosexual Person: New Thinking in Pastoral Care. In it, he critiqued the views of those theologians who argue that the Church's longstanding prohibition of same-sex acts is wrong. Among others, he also wrote two other books, The Truth about Homosexuality, and Homosexuality and the Catholic Church.

Harvey's position on same-sex attraction has been praised by both Catholic commentators  and high-ranking officials in the Catholic Church: in a forward to Homosexuality and the Catholic Church, Archbishop Raymond Burke expressed approval of Courage support groups, stating that "Father Harvey helps us all to think more clearly and to act more rightly and lovingly in responding to our brothers and sisters with same-sex attraction."

He has also faced criticism for his statements about the Catholic Church's sexual abuse scandal. In 2018, the Catholic newspaper Crux reported Harvey advocated for the return of abusive priests to ministry in the 1990s because these priests should be treated with the same compassion and forgiveness deserving of all same-sex attracted individuals. In 1992, Crisis Magazine interviewed Harvey about remarks he made at a U.S. Bishops' Workshop in 1990, where he argued that "most [priests who sexually abuse minors] should be rehabilitated and returned to ministry".

Harvey's statements about the Church's sexual abuse scandal have garnered criticism from Catholics otherwise to support Courage's mission to counsel same-sex attracted individuals under the Church's teachings on sexuality.

Retirement and death
Harvey retired to Annecy Hall, a retirement community for the Oblates of St. Francis de Sales in Childs, Maryland, in January 2010. He died on December 27, 2010, at Union Hospital in Elkton, Maryland, and was survived by his sister, Margaret Smith, and many nieces, nephews, and grand-nieces and grand-nephews. The Mass for Christian Burial for Harvey was celebrated on Friday, December 31, 2010, at Our Lady of Light Chapel, 1120 Blue Ball Road, Elkton, Maryland. He is buried at the Oblates of Saint Francis de Sales Cemetery, in Childs, Cecil County. Maryland.

Legacy
Harvey's approach won the endorsement of the Pontifical Council for the Family. Pope John Paul II said of this ministry, "Courage is doing the work of God!" In 2011, at the 31st Annual Courage Conference, Raymond Leo Cardinal Burke, then the Cardinal Prefect of the Supreme Tribunal of the Apostolic Signatura, gave a tribute to the work of Harvey.

Honorary degrees
Doctorate of Humane Letters (Honorary), Assumption College, 1986.
Doctorate of Humane Letters (Honorary), Allentown College of St. Francis de Sales (now DeSales University), 1988.

Other recognition
A chair in moral theology at DeSales University is named after Harvey.
A residential building for juniors and seniors at DeSales University was named for Harvey.

Selected works

See also

Catholics United
DignityUSA
Homosexuals Anonymous
Integrity USA
New Ways Ministry
Restored Hope Network

References

Catholic University of America alumni
Clergy from Philadelphia
1918 births
2010 deaths